Parliamentary elections were held in Rwanda on 25 September 1961 alongside a referendum on the country's monarchy. The result was a victory for MDR-Parmehutu, which won 35 of the 44 seats in the Legislative Assembly. Voter turnout was 96%.

They were the last multiparty elections held in Rwanda until 2003.

Results

References

Elections in Rwanda
Parliamentary
Rwanda
Parliament of Rwanda
Election and referendum articles with incomplete results